Vu T. Thu Ha is an interdisciplinary artist who works primarily in film, photography and conceptual art.

Vu's 2006 feature film Kieu, running time 74 minutes, in English, with Vietnamese dialogue, was inspired by Vietnamese epic poem Truyen Kieu (The Tale of Kieu), by Nguyen Du. Kieu premiered in March 2006 at the San Francisco International Asian American Film Festival.

Vu is also the director of 16mm films Each Night (2001) and Shut Up White Boy (2002). Shut Up White Boy, a comedic film that screened nationally and internationally, is about a young white man with an Asian fetish who "gets his cumuppence when the diner's staff of asian dykes decide on taking creative revenge."

References

Living people
Vietnamese artists
Interdisciplinary artists
Year of birth missing (living people)
American women film directors
21st-century American women